Rosario Tijeras is a Mexican telenovela created by Adriana Pelusi and Carlos Quintanilla that premiered on Azteca 13 on 30 October 2016, and ended on 14 December 2019 on Azteca 7. It stars Bárbara de Regil as the titular character. The series follows the life of a young student with behavior problems who suffers abuse and abuses by her stepfather and decides to start making her life on the wrong path to drugs and take revenge on all who hurt her.

The series is produced by Teleset for Sony Pictures Television and TV Azteca. It is based on the Colombian drama of the same name produced in 2010 and starring María Fernanda Yépez.

On 16 December 2018, TV Azteca renewed the series for a third season that premiered on 25 August 2019, and ended on 14 December 2019. Filming of the third season began in January 2019.

In 2019 it was confirmed that the third season would be the last.

Seasons 

Rosario (Bárbara de Regil) is a young student who, for the sake of destiny, becomes a hitman for León El Guero  (Hernán Mendoza) together with her brother Brandon (Luis Alberti) and El Fierro (Christian Vázquez), all since raped by criminals in her neighborhood where she lives, and the murder of her best friend. In her first revenge, Rosario meets Cacho (Iván Raday), her main aggressor to seduce him in her house and finally stab him in the genitals, thus earning her nickname Rosario Tijeras. Later, Rosario murders Gonzalo González "El General" (José Sefami), after he killed Delia (Daniela Soto) her best friend. For Rosario, "Loving is more difficult than killing", since she will be involved in a love triangle between Emilio (Antonio Gaona) and Antonio (José María de Tavira) thus causing a rivalry between these two friends for the heart of Rosario.

In season two, after having escaped death, Rosario and Antonio finally manage to evade their enemies to be free, but as they flee they are forced to separate from each other. Rosario is fooled by El Ángel (Sebastián Martínez) a mysterious and seductive man who hides a deep secret. Following this, Rosario will be crossroads in a vengeance between two criminal lords and will have to protect her little brother and Antonio, the great love of her life.

In season three, Rosario's world collapses when her daughter, Ruby, is kidnapped. To recover her, she will have to accept to collaborate with the police, being part of an elite squad dedicated to the capture of El Ángel. Rosario must work against the clock and with the feelings to the surface, because in the neighborhood nothing is what it seems.

Cast and characters

Rating

Mexico rating

U.S. rating

Awards and nominations

References

External links 
 

2016 telenovelas
2016 Mexican television series debuts
TV Azteca telenovelas
Mexican telenovelas
Mexican television series based on Colombian television series
Spanish-language telenovelas
2018 telenovelas
2019 telenovelas
2019 Mexican television series endings
Works about Mexican drug cartels
Sony Pictures Television telenovelas
Television shows remade overseas